Zukhriatul Hafizah Muhammad (born 8 July 1987) popularly known as Fizah Muhammad is an Indonesian secretary of Ministry of Transportation, model and beauty camp guru, who won the title of Puteri Indonesia Lingkungan 2009. She represented Indonesia at the Miss International 2010 pageant in Chengdu, China, where she won Miss Congeniality.

Early life and education
Hafizah graduated her bachelor degree in Business Accountant from The London School of Public Relations, Jakarta, Indonesia. She work as a secretary of the Indonesian Ministry of Transportation.

Pageantry

Puteri Indonesia 2009
Hafizah was crowned as Puteri Indonesia Lingkungan 2009 at the grand finale held in Jakarta Convention Center, Jakarta, Indonesia on 9 October 2009, by the outgoing titleholder of Puteri Indonesia Lingkungan 2008, Ayu Diandra Sari Tjakra of Bali.

Miss International 2010
As Puteri Indonesia Lingkungan 2009, Hafizah represented Indonesia at the 50th edition of Miss International 2010 pageant in held in Sichuan Province Gymnasium, Chengdu, China. The finale was held on 7 November 2010. She won Miss Friendship award at the pageant. Miss International 2009, Anagabriela Espinoza of Mexico crowned her successor, Elizabeth Mosquera of Venezuela, at the end of the event.

Training other competitors 
Puteri owns Ratu Sejagad, a beauty pageant camp in Indonesia. Competitors who have trained at the camp include Sonia Fergina Citra, who finished in the top 20 of Miss Universe 2018; Frederika Alexis Cull, top 10 of Miss Universe 2019; and Laksmi Shari De-Neefe Suardana, who will compete in Miss Universe 2022.

See also

 Puteri Indonesia 2009
 Miss International
 Miss International 2010
 Qory Sandioriva

References

External links
 Puteri Indonesia Official Website
 Miss International Official Website
 Zukhriatul Hafizah Official Instagram

Living people
1987 births
Puteri Indonesia winners
Miss International 2010 delegates
Indonesian beauty pageant winners
Indonesian female models
Indonesian politicians
Indonesian Muslims
People from North Sumatra
People from Jakarta
Javanese people